Rabisha Rocks (‘Skali Rabisha’ ska-'li ra-'bi-sha) is a group of rocks off the north coast of Greenwich Island in the South Shetland Islands, Antarctica situated  northeast of Voluyak Rocks,  north of Kabile Island and  west of Ongley Island.

The rocks are named after the settlement of Rabisha and the homonymous lake in northwestern Bulgaria.

Location

See also 
 Composite Antarctic Gazetteer
 List of Antarctic islands south of 60° S
 SCAR
 Territorial claims in Antarctica
 South Shetland Islands

Maps
 L.L. Ivanov. Antarctica: Livingston Island and Greenwich, Robert, Snow and Smith Islands. Scale 1:120000 topographic map.  Troyan: Manfred Wörner Foundation, 2009.

References
 Rabisha Rocks. SCAR Composite Antarctic Gazetteer
 Bulgarian Antarctic Gazetteer. Antarctic Place-names Commission. (details in Bulgarian, basic data in English)

External links
 Rabisha Rocks. Copernix satellite image

Rock formations of Greenwich Island
Bulgaria and the Antarctic